Mfanukhona Sendo Dlamini (born 5 October 1979) is a Swazi taekwondo practitioner. He competed in the men's 58 kg event at the 2000 Summer Olympics.

References

External links
 

1979 births
Living people
Swazi male taekwondo practitioners
Olympic taekwondo practitioners of Eswatini
Taekwondo practitioners at the 2000 Summer Olympics
Place of birth missing (living people)